WFEF-LD, virtual channel 50 (UHF digital channel 25), is a low-powered Azteca América-affiliated television station licensed to Orlando, Florida, United States. The station is owned by the DTV America Corporation.

WFEF-LD's digital signal originates from a transmitter located near the Silver Star Terrace neighborhood of Orlando just off Florida State Road 438.

History
The station's construction permit was issued under the callsign of W50EF-D on September 2, 2010. The current WFEF-LD calls were adapted on March 11, 2013.

In April 2017,  live streaming financial news network Cheddar started broadcasting over the air with DTV America, affiliating five stations, including WFEF-LD, with the network. Dunkin' Donuts, a Cheddar advertiser, was handing out free digital antennas at events in the stations' markets to publicize the over-the-air launch.

Digital channels
The station's digital signal is multiplexed:

References

External links

DTV America

Comet (TV network) affiliates
Stadium (sports network) affiliates
Low-power television stations in the United States
Innovate Corp.
FEF-LD
Television channels and stations established in 2015
2015 establishments in Florida